Uncial 0270 (in the Gregory-Aland numbering), is a Greek uncial manuscript of the New Testament. The manuscript paleographically has been assigned to the 4th/5th century.

Description 
It contains a small parts of the First Epistle to the Corinthians (15:10-15,19-25), on 1 parchment leaf (15.5 cm by 10.5 cm). Written in one column per page, 26 lines per page. 

The Greek text of this codex a representative of the Alexandrian text-type. Aland placed it in Category II. 

Currently it is dated by the INTF to the 4th or 5th century.

The codex currently is housed at the Library of the University of Amsterdam, in Amsterdam, with the shelf number GX 200.

It was examined by J.S. Sibinga, who published its text..

See also 
 List of New Testament uncials
 Textual criticism

References

Further reading 

 J. Smit Sibinga, A Fragment of Paul at Amsterdam (0270), in T. Baarda, A. F. J. Klijn and W. C. van Unnik (eds.), Miscellanea neotestamentica I (Leiden, 1978), pp. 23-44. 

Uncial 0270
4th-century biblical manuscripts